Entreprenant was a  74-gun ship of the line of the French Navy.

She was taken by the British when they captured Toulon, but was recaptured.

In 1793, she ferried prisoners suspected of anti-revolutionary sympathies from Toulon to Rochefort after Toulon was taken by the British.

She took part in the Glorious First of June and in the Croisière du Grand Hiver.

See also
 List of ships of the line of France

References

Ships of the line of the French Navy
Téméraire-class ships of the line
1787 ships